Bittacus is a genus of hangingflies in the order Mecoptera. Members of the genus have a cosmopolitan distribution. The genus has existed since at least the earliest Late Cretaceous. Bittacus is considered "grossly paraphyletic" and serves as a catch-all for many distantly related species of hangingflies.

Characteristics
Members of this genus have long legs, the front pair of which are modified for grasping and are used to hang from vegetation. The other two pairs have tarsal claws and are modified for catching prey. There are two pairs of equal sized, membranous wings with dark mottling. The mouthparts are modified for chewing. The insects superficially resemble crane flies.

Species
The following species are listed in the World Checklist of Extant Mecoptera Species:

Bittacus aequalis  Navás, 1914 – Kenya
Bittacus africanus Esben-Petersen, 1915 – Zaire
Bittacus alluaudi Navás, 1914 – Kenya, Tanzania, Ethiopia
Bittacus andinus Londt and Byers, 1974 – Bolivia, Peru
Bittacus angrensis Souza Lopes and Mangabeira, 1942 – Brazil
Bittacus annae Londt, 1972 – South Africa
Bittacus appendiculatus Esben-Petersen, 1927 – China (Yunnan)
Bittacus armatus Tjeder, 1956 – Zimbabwe, South Africa
Bittacus banksi Esben-Petersen, 1915 – Costa Rica, El Salvador, Guatemala, Honduras, Mexico, Panama
Bittacus berlandi Capra, 1939 – Tanzania, Kenya
Bittacus bicornis Londt, 1993  – South Africa
Bittacus boraceiensis  -Morgante, 1967 – Brazil (São Paulo)
Bittacus boranicus Capra, 1939 – Ethiopia
Bittacus brasiliensis Klug, 1838 – Argentina, Brazil
Bittacus brunneus Esben-Petersen, 1927 – Paraguay
Bittacus bullatus Londt, 1972 – South Africa
Bittacus burgeoni Navás, 1930  – Zaire
Bittacus burmanus Tjeder, 1974  – Burma
Bittacus byersi Londt, 1972 – South Africa
Bittacus capensis (Thunberg), 1784 – South Africa
Bittacus caprai Londt, 1972 – Zambia, Zimbabwe
Bittacus carpenteri Cheng, 1957 – China (Szechwan)
Bittacus chevalieri (Navás), 1908 – Chad, Mali, Senegal, French Somaliland
Bittacus chilensis Klug, 1838 – Chile
Bittacus chlorostigma MacLachlan, 1881 – United States (California, Oregon)
Bittacus chujoi Issiki and Cheng, 1947 – Taiwan
Bittacus cirratus Tjeder, 1956 – China (Manchuria, Kiangsi)
Bittacus contumax Tjeder, 1956 – China
Bittacus coreanus Issiki, 1929 – China (Kiangsu), Korea
Bittacus cottrelli Londt, 1972 – South Africa
Bittacus discors Navás, 1914 – Kenya, Somalia
Bittacus disternum Byers, 1996 – Costa Rica
Bittacus diversinervis Souza Lopes and Mangabeira, 1942 – Brazil 
Bittacus elisabethae Navás, 1930 – Zaire
Bittacus eremus Lambkin, 1988 – Australia
Bittacus erythrostigma Byers, 1975 – Uganda, Zaire
Bittacus femoralis Klug, 1838 – Brazil
Bittacus flavescens Klug, 1838 – Brazil, Venezuela
Bittacus formosanus Issiki, 1927 – Taiwan
Bittacus fritzi Williner, 1990 – Argentina
Bittacus fumosus Esben-Petersen, 1913 – Kenya, Zimbabwe, Tanzania, Zambia
Bittacus geniculatus Erichson, 1848 – Brazil, Guyana
Bittacus golbachi Williner, 1990 – Argentina
Bittacus gressitti Cheng, 1957 – China (Kwangtung)
Bittacus hageni Brauer, 1860 – Austria, Belgium, France
Bittacus henryi Kimmins, 1928 – Sri Lanka
Bittacus homburgerae Navás, 1933 – French Guinea
Bittacus indicus Walker 1853 – India
Bittacus insularis Esben-Petersen 1915 – Sri Lanka
Bittacus issikii Miyamoto 1979 – Japan
Bittacus italicus (Müller) 1766  -Belgium, Bosnia, Germany, Poland, Romania, Spain, Switzerland, Ukraine
Bittacus kagoshimaensis Issiki 1929  -Japan
Bittacus kimminsi Tjeder 1956 – South Africa
Bittacus kunenensis Wood 1933 – Namibia
Bittacus laevipes Navás 1909 – Japan
Bittacus latipennis Gerstaecker 1885 – India
Bittacus leptocaudus Byers 1965 – Thailand
Bittacus leptocercus Navás 1934 – Tanzania
Bittacus lineatus Navás 1914 – Kenya
Bittacus livingstonei Londt 1981 – Malawi
Bittacus maculatus Issiki 1927 – Taiwan
Bittacus maculosus Byers 1965 – Brazil, Trinidad
Bittacus malaisei Tjeder 1974 – Burma
Bittacus marginatus Miyake 1913 – Japan
Bittacus mastrillii Navás 1913 – Japan
Bittacus mexicanus Klug 1838 – Mexico (Oaxaca, San Luis Potosí)
Bittacus milleri Londt 1978 – South Africa
Bittacus montanus Weele 1910 – Angola, Cameroon, Kenya, Malawi, Zimbabwe, Rwanda, Tanzania, Uganda, Zaire, Zambia
Bittacus moschinus Navás 1914  – Malawi, Tanzania, Zambia
Bittacus natalensis Wood 1933 – Mozambique, Malawi, Zimbabwe, South Africa
Bittacus nebulosus Klug 1838 – Mozambique, South Africa
Bittacus nipponicus Navás 1909  – Japan
Bittacus nodosus Rust and Byers 1976 – India, Pakistan
Bittacus occidentis Walker 1853 – United States
Bittacus omega Morgante 1967 – Brazil
Bittacus oreinus Navás 1914 – Ethiopia
Bittacus panamensis Byers 1958  – Costa Rica, Panama, Venezuela
Bittacus peninsularis Byers 1996 – Mexico (Baja California Sur)
Bittacus peringueyi Esben-Petersen 1913 – South Africa
Bittacus peterseni Kimmins 1938 – South Africa
Bittacus pieli Navás 1935 – China (Kiangsi)
Bittacus pignatellii Navás 1932 – Panama
Bittacus pilicornis Westwood 1846 – Canada, United States
Bittacus pinguipalpi Wood 1933 – Namibia
Bittacus pintoi Souza Lopes and Mangabeira 1942 – Brazil
Bittacus planus Cheng 1949 – China (Shensi)
Bittacus pobeguini (Navás) 1908 – Zaire, Ghana, Ivory Coast, Nigeria, Uganda
Bittacus pollex Byers and Roggero 1992 – Panama
Bittacus punctiger Westwood 1846 – United States
Bittacus rossi Londt 1977 – Zaire
Bittacus saigusai Miyamoto 1984 – Japan
Bittacus schoutedeni Esben-Petersen 1913 – Zaire
Bittacus selysi Esben-Petersen 1917 – South Africa
Bittacus sinensis Walker 1853 – China (Chekiang, Kiangsu), Korea, Japan
Bittacus sinicus Issiki 1931 – China (Szechwan)
Bittacus sjostedti Weele 1910 – Kenya, Tanzania
Bittacus smithersi Londt 1972 – South Africa
Bittacus sobrinus Tjeder 1956 – South Africa
Bittacus sonani Issiki 1929 – Taiwan
Bittacus spatulatus Byers 1996 – Costa Rica, Nicaragua
Bittacus stanleyi Byers 1968 – Zaire, Malawi
Bittacus stigmaterus Say 1823 – United States
Bittacus striatus Issiki 1927 – Taiwan
Bittacus strigosus Hagen 1861 – United States
Bittacus sylvaticus Byers 1996  – Mexico
Bittacus takaoensis Miyake 1913 – Japan
Bittacus taraiensis Penny 1969 – India
Bittacus tarsalis Miyamoto 1984 – Japan
Bittacus testaceus Klug 1838 – Zimbabwe, South Africa
Bittacus texanus Banks 1908 – United States (Kansas, New Mexico, Texas)
Bittacus tienmushana Cheng 1957 – China (Chekiang)
Bittacus tjederi Londt 1970 – South Africa
Bittacus triangularis Issiki 1929 – Korea, Manchuria
Bittacus tuxeni Byers 1975 – Guinea, Malawi
Bittacus ussuriensis Plutenko 1985 – Far Eastern Russia
Bittacus vexilliferus Byers 1970 – China (Szechwan)
Bittacus vumbanus Smithers 1960 – Zimbabwe
Bittacus wahlbergi Londt 1972 – South Africa
Bittacus walkeri Esben-Petersen 1915 – South Africa
Bittacus weelei Esben-Petersen 1913 – Angola, Ethiopia, Ghana, Malawi, Nigeria, Tanzania, Uganda, Zaire, Zambia
Bittacus zambezinus Navás 1931 – Mozambique, Malawi, Zimbabwe, South Africa
Bittacus zelichi Williner 1990 – Argentina
Bittacus zulu Londt 1972 – South Africa

Extinct species
 †Bittacus lepiduscretaceus Li et al. 2018 Burmese amber, Myanmar, Cenomanian
 †Bittacus succinus Carpenter 1954 Baltic amber, Eocene

References

 
Hangingflies
Insects described in 1805